Hollister Jackson (December 7, 1875 – November 2, 1927) was the 56th lieutenant governor of Vermont; he was killed in the Great Flood of 1927.

Early life
Samuel Hollister Jackson was born in Toronto, Ontario, Canada on December 7, 1875, the son of Samuel Nelson Jackson (1838–1913) and Mary Anne (Parkyn) Jackson (1843–1916).  Jackson's siblings included H. Nelson Jackson, a prominent Burlington, Vermont businessman, and J. Holmes Jackson (1871–1944), who served as mayor of Burlington from 1917 to 1925 and 1929 to 1933.

Hollister Jackson attended the Collegiate Institute in Kingston, Ontario and Kingston's Queen's University.  He received degrees from the University of Toronto (bachelor of music, 1896) and the University of Vermont (Bachelor of Arts, 1898).  Jackson moved to Barre City, Vermont, where he supported his family by giving piano, organ and music composition lessons while studying law.  He was admitted to the bar in 1900 and practiced in Barre City.

Career
In 1901 he was elected Barre's Grand Juror (municipal court prosecutor) and he served as Washington County State's Attorney from 1904 to 1906, succeeding John H. Senter. He served in the Vermont House of Representatives from 1906 to 1907, and as a member of the state Railroad Commission (later called the Public Service Commission) from 1906 until 1913.  He was also a major in the Army Reserve Judge Advocate General Corps.

Jackson was an owner of the E.L. Smith & Company granite manufacturing business, President of the Vermont Bar Association and the National Granite Producers' Association, and a member of the Masons, Shriners and Knights of Pythias.

Election as Lieutenant Governor
In 1926 he was the successful Republican nominee for Lieutenant Governor and served from January, 1927 until his death.

Death
During the Great Vermont Flood on November 2, 1927, Jackson's car stalled after he hit a deep hole while attempting to drive through the rising Potash Brook near his home at Nelson and Tremont Streets in Barre.  According to a witness, Jackson's hat and glasses were knocked off, and he appeared dazed.  He began walking towards his house, and water rushing fast enough to cut a channel across Nelson Street (then a dirt road) carried him away.  Those nearby attempted unsuccessfully to save him, as did a Vermont National Guard detachment.  He drowned, and the next day his body was recovered from the Potash approximately a mile from where he was last seen.

Burial
Jackson was buried in the family plot of William Wells at Lakeview Cemetery in Burlington. Hollister Jackson was the brother of H. Nelson Jackson, who was married to Wells's daughter Bertha.

Family
In 1909, Jackson married Mabel Maude Parkyn (1874–1968), usually known as Maude.  They were the parents of two sons, Nelson Parkyn Jackson (1910–1960) and Samuel Hollister Jackson (1916–1995).

Photos

References

External links
Samuel Hollister Jackson at The Political Graveyard

1875 births
1927 deaths
Lieutenant Governors of Vermont
University of Toronto alumni
University of Vermont alumni
People from Barre, Vermont
Military personnel from Vermont
Republican Party members of the Vermont House of Representatives
Vermont lawyers
State's attorneys in Vermont
Politicians from Toronto
Canadian emigrants to the United States
Natural disaster deaths in Vermont
Deaths by drowning in the United States
Deaths in floods
Burials at Lakeview Cemetery (Burlington, Vermont)
19th-century American lawyers